Kabhi Haan Kabhi Naa is a Hindi television comedy-drama series that aired on Zee TV channel from 8 November 2004 to 19 May 2005. The story deals with three guys having a distinctly different take on love, life and relationships.

Plot 
The story is based on the lives of three boys. All three have many different ways of attracting girls.

Aditya (nickname Adi) is always in search of his dream girl which keeps changing daily. This is the reason he keeps an empty photo frame in his room. He is a perfect gentleman and a very romantic kind of guy who works in his own company, but does nothing since everything is taken care of by his brother. All he does is go to his office and sit in his cubicle with a very cute secretary and then go home. He sometimes escorts visiting delegates, especially if they are female.

Chetan is flirt; handsome and very good looking. He works in an ad agency, but always makes others, especially women, do the work for him. He does not believe in love. His is always a "wham bam, thank you mam" kind of relationship. But he falls in love with a girl who is already engaged.

Dipankar is completely out of shape and has a sister who wants to marry him off before he gets spoiled by his friends. He works in a bank. He is always afraid of his sister who is an IAS officer.

Even though all these boys are apart from each other in their personality and style, they are best friends who help each other setting up girls.

Cast 
 Mihir Mishra as Aditya (Adi) 
 Kushal Punjabi as Chetan 
 Vishal Singh as Dipankar 
 Dimple Inamdar as Ananya
 Muskaan Mihani as Sanjana
 Gaurav Chopra as Kabir Jairath
 Satyajit Sharma as Kartik
 Payal Nair as Vandana
 Tarana Raja as Devika
 Divya Jagdale as Vishakha
 Kiku Sharda as Jay
 Sonia Kapoor as Avantika
 Suhasi Goradia Dhami as Samantha (Sam)

External links
Official Site

2004 Indian television series debuts
2005 Indian television series endings
Indian television soap operas
Zee TV original programming
Indian comedy television series